Kenneth Carl Felton (18 February 1949 – 9 July 2020) was an English footballer who made 52 appearances in the Football League playing as a full back for Darlington in the late 1960s. He also played non-league football for South Shields. He played for Durham Schools under-15 team in the 1964–65 season.

References

1949 births
2020 deaths
People from Blackhall Colliery
Footballers from County Durham
English footballers
Association football defenders
Darlington F.C. players
South Shields F.C. (1936) players
English Football League players